The Museum of Contemporary Art Jacksonville, also known as MOCA Jacksonville, is a contemporary art museum in Jacksonville, Florida, funded and operated as a "cultural institute" of the University of North Florida. One of the largest contemporary art institutions in the Southeastern United States, it presents exhibitions by international, national and regional artists.

History 
MOCA Jacksonville was founded in 1924 as the Jacksonville Fine Arts Society, the first organization in the Jacksonville community devoted to the visual arts. In 1948 the museum was incorporated as the Jacksonville Art Museum, and in 1978 it became the first institution in Jacksonville to be accredited by the American Alliance of Museums.

In late 1999 the museum acquired its permanent home, the historic Western Union Telegraph Building on Hemming Plaza, built by The Auchter Company, adjacent to the newly renovated City Hall, and became the Jacksonville Museum of Modern Art (JMOMA). In 2000, a series of preview exhibitions opened in a temporary exhibition space while the building facade was restored to its original Art Deco style. The interior was completely refurbished to house the museum's galleries, educational facilities, a theater/auditorium, Museum Shop and Café Nola.

Growth 
After moving to its downtown location the museum experienced rapid growth in both membership and the size of the permanent collection. The many substantial additions to the collection increased not only its quality, but also its size to almost 800 pieces. After completing a recent review of the current scope of the museum's collection and exhibitions, discussions were held regarding the distinctions between modern and contemporary art, as well as the museum's mission and vision for the future. It was decided that in order for the museum to convey a strong sense of identity and purpose to both the community and other art institutions across the country, its name should change. Therefore, in November 2006, JMOMA became the Museum of Contemporary Art Jacksonville.

The museum continues to be a cornerstone of Jacksonville's multibillion-dollar downtown revitalization plan. Its exhibitions and programming bring new visitors to the civic core during the day, at night and on weekends. Educational programming includes children's literacy initiatives and weekend art making classes as well as regular tours, lectures, films and publications for children and adults.

MOCA Jacksonville is an inviting environment in which to learn about the art of our time. Stroll through the permanent collection galleries and view the works of Hans Hofmann, Joan Mitchell, James Rosenquist, Ed Paschke, and other contemporary masters. MOCA Jacksonville's changing exhibitions feature the works of many contemporary artists working in a wide assortment of media from painting, sculpture, and video. The third floor hosts exhibitions, which rotate approximately every four months, designed to provide insightful, stimulating and educational experiences.

The University of North Florida acquired the museum in 2009 to act as a cultural resource of the university.

Past exhibitions

2017
 Project Atrium: Juan Fontanive, Movement 4
 Call & Response
 Project Atrium: Gabriel Dawe, Plexus No. 38
 Synthesize: Art + Music
 Project Atrium: Lauren Fensterstock
 Bands of Color: the Use of Line in Contemporary Art
 Hans Hofmann: Works on Paper
 The Evolution of Mark-Making
 UNF Gallery Iterations: Lorrie Fredette
 UNF Gallery Frank Rampolla: the DNA of the Mark
 Another Side Revealed: Art with a Heart in Healthcare
 Art Camp Anthology

2016
 Retro-spective: Analog Photography in a Digital World
 Breaking Ground: the Donald and Maria Cox Collection
 Project Atrium: Shinique Smith: Quickening
 Project Atrium: Nicola Lopez
 Confronting the Canvas: Women of Abstraction
 Project Atrium: Ethan Murrow
 Time Zones: James Rosenquist and Printmaking at the Millennium
 In Living Color: Andy Warhol and Contemporary Printmaking (from the Collections of Jordan D. Schnitzer and His Family)
 UNF Gallery Leaves: Recent Prints and Sculpture by Donald Martin
 UNF Gallery Sustain: Clay to Table
 UNF Gallery Amer Kobaslija: A Sense of Place
 UNF Gallery The Other: Nurturing a New Ecology in Printmaking
 Mary Ratcliff, Interwoven: Hear, Home, and Community
 Inside the Outline: Art with a Heart in Healthcare
 Rock Paper Scissors: the Printmaking Process

2015
 Project Atrium: Ian Johnston: Fish Tales
 Smoke and Mirrors: Sculpture and the Imaginary
 Project Atrium: Joelle Dietrick: Cargomobilities
 Southern Exposure: Portraits of a Changing Landscape
 In Time We Shall Know Ourselves: Photographs by Raymond Smith
 Project Atrium; Angela Glajcar: Terforation
 WHITE
 UNF Gallery Avery Lawrence: Live in Jacksonville
 UNF Gallery Assemblage/Collage: Works by Phil Parker
 UNF Gallery John Hee Taek Chae: Barbara Ritzman Devereux Visiting Artist Exhibition
 UNF Gallery 2015 Art Ventures Grant Awards Artists, The Community Foundation for Northeast Florida
 Amanda Rosenblatt: Allegory of Fortune
 Unmasked: Art with a Heart in Healthcare
 Art Aviators Exhibition

2014
 Project Atrium: Angela Strassheim
 Get Real: New American Painting
 Project Atrium: Caroline Lathan-Steifel: Wider Than the Sky
 The New York Times Magazine Photographs
 Project Atrium: Sean Thurston
 Observing Objects: Works by Leigh Murphy
 Material Transformations
 Erica Mendoza: Visual Love Letters
 A Thousand Words: A Photo Response Project
 Express Your #Selfie: Art with a Heart in Healthcare
 Scholastic Art Exhibition: Gold Key Portfolio Winners
 Rainbow Artists Exhibition
 UNF Gallery Art + Design Faculty Exhibition
 UNF Gallery Juxtaposition: Works by Larry Wilson & Laurie Hitzig
 UNF Gallery Backdoor Formalism
 UNF Gallery Bede Clarke: Barbara Ritzman Devereux Visiting Artist Exhibition

2013
 Art with a Heart in Healthcare
 Project Atrium: Heather Cox
 Kept Time: Photographs by Joseph D. Jachna
 Inside/Out: MOCA's Permanent Collection
 Project Atrium: Sarah Emerson
 Michael Aurbach
 SLOW: Marking Time in Photography and Film
 UNF Student Juried Exhibition
 First Coast Portfolio

2012
 Project Atrium: Ian Bogost
 ReFocus: Art of the 1980s
 Project Atrium: Tristin Lowe
 Annual UNF Art & Design Faculty Exhibition
 In This Moment: Art with a Heart in Healthcare Exhibition
 Rendering Italy: UNF Art and Design Faculty Abroad
 ReFocus: Art of the 1970s
 Project Atrium: Mark Licari
 The Joys of Collecting: Selections from the Eisen Collection
 Rainbow Artists: Art and Autism Across the Spectrum Exhibition
 Carrie Ann Baade: Solar Midnight
 Joe Forkan: The Lebowski Cycle
 North East Florida Scholastic Art Award
 ReFocus: Art of the 1960s

2011
 Tamara Culbert: 2011 Memphis Wood Excellence in Teaching Award
 Project Atrium: Gustavo Godoy
 UNF Art and Design Faculty Exhibition
 Larry Clark: The Tulsa Series
 Shared Vision: The Sondra Gilman and Celso Gonzalez-Falla Collection of Photography
 No Place in Particular: Images of the American Landscape
 Project Atrium: Melanie Pullen
 What a Doll: The Human Object as Toy
 Stranger in Paradise: The Works of Reverend Howard Finster
 What A Doll: The Human Object As Toy
 Rainbow Artists: Art and Autism Across the Spectrum Exhibition
 FUSION: Ceramic Exhibition by the FIRM: Shane Christensen, Brian Jensen, Stephen Heywood, and Michael Schmidt
 Wind Weaver and the Whirling Wheel: A Tale of Wolfbat Romance
 The Art of Seating: 200 Years of American Design
 Chair Installation by Dolf James
 Edge of Your Seat: Design Challenge, a juried student show in conjunction with The Art of Seating

2010
 East/West: Visually Speaking
 UNF Art and Design Faculty Exhibition
 Imagination Squared: A Community Response Project
 Hyperbolic Nature: Plein Air Paintings by Lilian Garcia-Roig
 Tradition Redefined: The Larry and Brenda Thompson Collection of African American Art
 Marilyn Monroe: Life as a Legend
 Looking Forward, Looking Back: Celebrating the Contributions and Careers of Artist/Educators Larry Davis, Mark Howard & Paul Ladnier
 Dan Estabrook: Forever and Never

2009
 Separate Strategies & Common Goals
 Hamish MacEwan: 90 in 09
 Robert Motherwell: Lost in Form, Found in Line
 The Art of Teaching: UNF Faculty Exhibition
 Emergence: Works by UNF Sculpture Students
 Balance and Power: Performance and Surveillance in Video Art
 Jazz Giants: The Photography of Herman Leonard
 Why Look at Animals? Photography from the George Eastman Collection

2008
 Ultra-Realistic Sculpture by Marc Sijan
 Making Marks: Jacksonville Creates
 The Shape Of Things: Selections From The Permanent Collection
 And Further the Dew Drop Falls: Installations by Chris Natrop
 Civitates Orbis Terrarum: Recent Drawings by John Bailly
 Carly, So Far: Photographs by Francie Bishop Good
 Memphis Wood: Jacksonville's First Lady of the Arts
 Contemporary Visions: A Focus on Jacksonville Collections
 Ramen Noodles 2008: Installation by Sang-Wook Lee
 Continental Shifts: The Art of Edouard Duval-Carrié

2007
 Essence and Materials: Works by Minoru Ohira
 Sculptures by Duncan Johnson
 Raddle Cross & Dowsing: Installations by Martha Whittington
 Coherent Structures: Recent Silverpoint Paintings by Carol Prusa
 Valuistics: The Making Of: An Installation by James Greene
 Contemporary Currents: Selections from the Bank of America Collection
 Impermanence: Recent Works by Andrés Michelena
 Keyhole: Constructed Paintings by Todd Murphy
 Second Skins: Sculptural Soundsuits and Tondos by Nick Cave
 Anderson and Low: Athlete/Warrior

2006
 Green Grass/Black Wings: Paintings by Ian Chase
 Time Capsules: Illuminated Works by Jon Davis
 Bloom: Paintings and Constructions by Luis Cruz Azaceta
 Pilgrimages: Large-Scale Drawings by Clive King
 Nature of Elegy: Works by Timothy McDowell
 Flow: Paintings & Installations by Radcliffe Bailey
 Illuminating Space: New Works by Zac Freeman
 Artifacts: Photographs by David Halliday
 Cheerleaders, Bodybuilders and Disco Queens: Photographs by Brian Finke & Morten Nilsson
 Sheltering Eye: Selections from the Prentice and Paul Sack Photography Collection

2005
 That's Another Story: Works by Ke Francis
 30th Parallel: A Convergence of Contemporary Painting featuring Radcliffe Bailey, John Bailly, Jim Barsness, Luisa Basnuevo, Mark Messersmith, Rocio Rodriguez, Lynne Ridings, Barry Sparkman
 Transitions: Sculptures and Prints by Joe Segal
 Activating Space: Sculpture as Environment featuring Tim Curtis, David Geiser, George Long, Jeffery Loy & Joe Martin, Michael Murrell, Jimmy O'Neal
 Tonya Lee: New Works
 Shared Vision: Photographs of Baracoa, Cuba – A Collaborative Documentary

2004
 Mark Sain Wilson: Photographs
 Image & Energy: Selections from the Haskell Collection
 Pam Longobardi: World within Worlds
 Push Play: Redefining Pop featuring Ray Azcuy, Didi Dunphy, David Isenhour, J. Ivcevich, Federico Uribe and Irene Clouthier
 Arnold Mesches: A Painting History 1940-2003
 Fruition: New Works by Sarah Crooks Flaire

2003
 David Crown: Mezzotints
 Subject/Object: Photographs by Jay Shoots
 Intuition & Response: Masterworks from the Edward R. Broida Collection
 Jonathan Lux: New Paintings
 High Tide: Works by Joe Walters
 Woody Cornwell: New Paintings
 Skin: Contemporary Views of the Body featuring Magdalena Abakanowicz, Sebastian Blanck, Connie Imboden, Pam Longobardi, Rona Pondick, Terry Rodgers
 The Consuming Image: New Painterly Pop featuring Alisa Henriquez, Ales Bask Hostomsky, James Mahoney, Chris Peldo, Michael Thrush, David Williams

2002
 Alt.Photo: Redefining Process featuring Linda Broadfoot, Thomas Hager, Paul Karabinis, Dominick Martorelli
 Contemporary Regional Sculptors featuring Nofa Dixon, Bob Kirk, Jan Tomlinson Master, David Royal Olson

2001
 Neobotanica: Flora by Four Contemporary Artists featuring David Collins, David Geiser, Timothy McDowell, Barbara Rogers
 American Beauty: Sculptures by Jack Dowd
 Towards the Organic: Material and Metaphor featuring Karen Rich Beall, Tim Curtis, Celeste Roberge

2000
 Image Electric: The Work of Richard Heipp

References

External links
MOCA Jacksonville Official Website

Art museums established in 1924
Art museums and galleries in Florida
1924 establishments in Florida
Art Deco architecture in Florida
Contemporary art galleries in the United States
Modern art museums in the United States
Museums in Jacksonville, Florida
University museums in Florida
Downtown Jacksonville
Northbank, Jacksonville
Laura Street
University of North Florida